Chittagong Veterinary and Animal Sciences University (CVASU) is a public university in Bangladesh. It is the only specialised veterinary university in Bangladesh. It is located at Khulshi, Chattogram. The chancellor of the university is president Abdul Hamid. Generally, the public universities in Bangladesh offer degree on department. Like every other agricultural university in Bangladesh, CVASU offers degree on faculty.

The fifth Annual Scientific Conference of Chittagong Veterinary and Animal Sciences University was held in 2007. Recently, on 19 September 2017, the 3rd National DVM Intern Research Conference, 2017 was held.

History

In 1995–1996, the Bangladesh government established two veterinary colleges in Sylhet and Chittagong. Later, two more veterinary colleges were established at Dinajpur and Barisal. The initial name of the Veterinary College in Chittagong was Chittagong Government Veterinary College, abbreviated as CGVC. The institute started its journey in January 1997 as a college under the University of Chittagong with 50 students.
The University of Chittagong transformed the college into a separate faculty with the permission of the University Grants Commission for the large syllabus of the college. At that time there was no agricultural university or veterinary university in the whole of Chittagong. As a result, there was a strong demand to transform CGVC into a separate university.
Various journalists and academics in Chittagong agree with this demand. This demand took the form of a movement. The movement was led by Yusuf Chowdhury, a social worker from Chittagong and chairman of the daily Purbakon. For his contribution, a building in CVASU was named as Yusuf Chowdhury building. As a result of this movement, in 2005 the Prime Minister's Office ordered the transformation of CGVC into a university. Following this, the then Prime Minister Begum Khaleda Zia inaugurated it on 2 February 2006, as Chittagong Veterinary and Animal Sciences University. It was later launched on 7 August 2006, through an ordinance. At first the university only started its journey with the Faculty of Veterinary Medicine. At present, the university conducts its academic activities with a total of three faculties, including two more faculties, namely Food Science and Technology and Fisheries.

List of vice-chancellors 
 Professor Nitish Chandra Debnath (5 November 2006 – 4 November 2010)
 Professor Dr. Abusaleh Mahfuzul Bari  (24 November 2010 – 23 November 2014)
 Professor Dr. Goutam Buddha Das (9 December 2014 – 8 December 2018, 9 December 2018 – 8 December 2022)  )
 Professor Dr. A.S.M Lutful Ahasan (present)

Campuses

Main campus 
All the administrative functions of the university are conducted on the main campus. The main campus has two separate halls for students. One is MA Hannan Hall and the other is Bangamata Fazilatunnesa hall. There are also administrative buildings, Yusuf Chowdhury building, Shaheed Minar and some other buildings. There are various facilities including Anatomy Museum, Fisheries Museum.

Anatomy Museum 
It is the first anatomy museum in the country. The museum was built in 2016 under the University Grants Commission's HECAP project. The museum is overseen by the university's Department of Anatomy and Histology. Horses, cows, deer, camels, ducks, goats, sheep, pigeons, crocodiles, snakes, lizards, pigs, ostriches and monkeys are preserved in this museum. There are 30 stuffed animals, 20 animal models, 500 specimens of formaldehyde, 2000 different types of bones, 3000 different slides and stills of 30 scientists. Some dried soft limbs have also been preserved in the museum.

Halls 

There are two halls for the students. One is for female and the other is for male:
 Bangamata Fazilatunnesa Hall
 Bir Muktizoddha MA Hannan Hall

Cox's Bazar outreach campus 

The campus is actually a research-based campus of the university which is mainly focused on sea-related projects. Construction of hatchery and filtration unit is going on the campus. This campus is the first outreach campus for an autonomous public university. Fisheries department of CVASU also began crab farming in the campus.

Hathazari research and farm based campus 

It is a research and farm-based campus of the university which is located at Hathazari Upazila in Chittagong. Two new institutes, two new faculty will be opened at the campus. 180 crore bdt (taka) will be spent to construct the campus.

Teaching & Training Pet Hospital and Research Center 
It is the country's first-ever pet hospital. Here, Teaching and Training Pet Hospital and Research Center provides hands-on training to interns and postgraduate veterinary doctors.

Academics

Degrees offered
 Doctor of Veterinary Medicine (D.V.M.): five years including a one-year internship (off-campus work-based learning). The D.V.M. course consists of 25% animal production, 10% social science courses and the remaining is for veterinary disciplines.
 BSc Honours in Food Science & Technology (FST)
 BSc Honours in Fisheries (FF)
 Master of Science (M.S.)

Faculty of Veterinary Medicine
 Department of Anatomy & Histology
 Department of Animal Science & Nutrition
 Department of Agricultural Economics and Social Science
 Department of Dairy & Poultry Science
 Department of Genetics & Animal Breeding
 Department of Medicine & Surgery
 Department of Microbiology & Veterinary Public Health
 Department of Pathology & Parasitology
 Department of Physiology, Biochemistry & Pharmacology

Faculty of Food Science and Technology
 Department of Applied Chemistry & Chemical Technology
 Department of Physical & Mathematical Science
 Department of Applied Food science & Nutrition
 Department of Food Processing & Engineering

Faculty of Fisheries

 Department of Aquaculture
 Department of Fisheries Resources Management
 Department of Fishing & Post Harvest Technology
 Department of Marine Bio-Resources Science
 Department of Fish Biology & Biotechnology

Admission

Undergraduate
Undergraduate admission is conducted through a cluster system admission test where a single exam is taken for seven Universities which provide education in the field of Agricultural Sciences these are Chittagong Veterinary and Animal Sciences University, Bangabandhu Sheikh Mujibur Rahman Agricultural University, Bangladesh Agricultural University, Sher-e-Bangla Agricultural University, Sylhet Agricultural University, Khulna Agricultural University and Patuakhali Science and Technology University. The subject choice and campus choice depends on the student's merit position and personal preference.

Institutes

Poultry Research and Training Center (PRTC) 
The Poultry Research and Training Centre (PRTC) has been established on 11 March 2008 with the financial support from Agricultural Sector Programme Support (ASPS) II of Danida at the Chittagong Veterinary and Animal Sciences University (CVASU) campus, within the legal framework of the university Act 2006 (Act 30 of 2006). PRTC is an autonomous institution, in accordance with the provision of the university Act 16 July 2006. In recent years, Muhammad Kabirul Islam Khan, from Department of Genetics and Animal Breeding, was invented a new breed crossed between Faomi and indigenous chicken which will grow rapidly as Faomi but the taste of the meat will as the indigenous chicken.

One Health Institute

Institute of Coastal Biodiversity, Marine Fisheries and Wildlife Conservation 
This institution located at Cox's Bazar outreach campus of the university.

Noted people

Alumni 
 Professor Dr. A.S.M Lutful Ahasan, first Vice-Chancellor from alumni
 Salma Sultana, awarded Borlaug award for field research and application, also awarded Joy Bangla Award

Faculty 
 Goutam Buddha Das, awarded Ekushey Padak in 2022

References

External links

 Ministry of Agriculture
 Ministry of Fisheries and Livestock
 Ministry of Education
 University Grants Commission Bangladesh
 Ministry of Food
 Ministry of Science and Technology

Public universities of Bangladesh
Universities and colleges in Chittagong
Veterinary schools in Bangladesh